Peumerit formerly Peumérit,  is a commune in the Finistère department of Brittany in north-western France.

Population
Inhabitants of Peumerit are called in French Peumeritois.

History

Modern period 
This municipally is known for facts related to the revolt of "bonnets rouges" traduce, the red caps, in 1675. In 1759, an order from Louis XV order to the parish of Peumerit to provide 20 men and to pay 131 livres for "the annual expense of the coastguard of Britain".

French Revolution 
The parish of Peumerit, which included 140 fires, elects two delegates, Alain Le Brun and Pierre Canevet, for represent it to the third-state assembly of the seneschal of Quimper, in the spring of 1789.

The 20th Century 
A political and religious life agitated

The expulsion of the clergy of the Peumerit Parish trains on the 11 March 1909 the decision of M.Duparc to ban all the religious ringtones, even for the Angélus and funerals, a priest installed in the presbytery of Treogat, is charged to visit ills, to proceed at funerals and administer the sacraments.

Breton language
The municipality launched a linguistic plan concerning the Breton language through Ya d'ar brezhoneg on 9 June 2006.

See also
Communes of the Finistère department

References

External links

Official website 

Mayors of Finistère Association 

Communes of Finistère